Warong Nasi Pariaman is an eatery along North Bridge Road and Kandahar Street in Singapore. The restaurant is believed to be the oldest surviving stall selling Nasi Padang in Singapore.

History
The eatery was founded in 1948 by Haji Isrin at the corner of North Bridge Road and Kandahar Street. After Haji retired, the business went to his wife, Hajah Rosnah. In 1988, the business went to their sons Sudirman, Jumrin and Abdul, and their wives. However, Sudirman, who had been heading the team, later left.

In 2021, the National Heritage Board designated the eatery as a "mini-museum". This was done in an effort to raise awareness to smaller business with a long history and were often overlooked.

Reception
Anette Tan of the Condé Nast Traveler included the restaurant in her list of the 28 Best Restaurants in Singapore in 2019. In 2016, it was awarded the Heritage Heroes Award for preserving local culinary traditions.

References

Restaurants in Singapore